Cerro Provincia is a mountain on the eastern side of Santiago, Chile. It is a popular climb due to its accessibility and low level of difficulty by mountaineering standards (an 'F' or 'easy' on the Alpine scale). There is a small dome-shaped refuge shelter at the summit. There are fairly well traveled paths that go to the summit and marker posts. The peak offers views of Santiago to the west, the Andes to the east, and Cerro El Plomo to the north.

Attempting a summit
There are several trails to access the mountain. The shortest marked and most commonly used trail starts near Puente Ñilhue (the Ñilhue Bridge) in the valley on the north side that contains a stream feeding the Mapocho River. The entrance at Puente Ñilhue is accessible by taxi ride from Santiago. As of 2011, there is a guard at the entrance of the trail where all hikers need to register and pay 1,500 Chilean pesos. The trail officially opens at 8:00 and closes at 20:00. Hikers planning on hiking outside these times need to contact the guards in advance.

People in fair physical condition can make the full ascent and descent in one day but it is quite exhausting. The ascent takes about 5–7 hours (without heavy backpacks) and the descent about 4–5 hours for average hikers. The start of the ascent from the northern-route includes a steep, rocky section where hikers need to hold on to an installed iron chain (a via ferrata) for several meters. This may give a false impression of the subsequent climb because no such fixture is encountered afterwards. Subsequently, the first two hours of the trail are steep, reaching a wide-open area known as Alto del Naranjo, with the biggest tree of all the trail (the Great Tree) right in the middle, which is visible from most of the rest of the trail all the way to the top. This is followed by about an hour of relatively flat section, which ends at the last tree on the trail (Pawel's Tree). The next two hours are again steep, and on loose rocky ground which makes it difficult to walk up and down. The last hour requires climbing up and down some big boulders, and there is a small section just before the summit where hands must be used (see scrambling).

There are several camping sites on the lower part of the mountain, and there is a refuge at the top which can accommodate 6 people comfortably. However, the nights at the summit can be near freezing even in the hottest days of the summer, and while the refuge protects from the strong winds at the top, it does not protect from the cold. Climbers intending on camping at the summit should bring warm clothing and an appropriately rated sleeping bag.

The mountain is extremely hot, dry, and shadeless during the summer and an ample amount of water is crucial. There is a watering-station early on in the climb on the north route to the summit of the sub-peak called Alto del Naranjo, but in general hikers should start with their full water supply: 3 liters or more per day is recommended.

The mountain is not technical and a non-winter summit requires little equipment besides perhaps a hiking stick and a comfortable pair of boots. Rope is not necessary.

Flora and fauna
The mountain does not contain much vegetation or animal life and their presence dwindle with altitude. Mostly there are cacti, small shrubs, short trees, lizards, occasional viscachas, and birds, including hawks and condors. There are also feral horses and even donkeys and cows. The horses can occasionally be seen grazing even at the summit.

See also
Cerro El Plomo
Cerro de Ramón

External links
Entry in the Andes Handbook 
Andes Terrae entry 
A summit log by Rodrigo Sandoval 

Mountains of Santiago Metropolitan Region
Principal Cordillera